Monmouth is a city in Polk County in the U.S. state of Oregon. It was named for Monmouth, Illinois, the origin of its earliest settlers. The population is 11,110 at the 2020 Census and it is part of the Salem Metropolitan Statistical Area.

History
Monmouth was settled in 1853 by a group of pioneers who allocated  to build both a city and a "college under the auspices of the Christian Church", and proceeds from the sale of these lands were used to found Monmouth University, currently known as Western Oregon University. 
For decades, Monmouth was a dry town that banned the sale of alcoholic beverages in supermarkets, restaurants and bars. Monmouth's status as the last dry town in Oregon was ended by a popular vote in the November 2002 election.

Prohibition
Monmouth was settled by Elijah Davidson and his family. Originally an elder of the Christian Church of Cameron (Monmouth, Illinois), Davidson was a devout advocate of prohibition. In 1850, sixty-seven-year-old Elijah Davidson and his family set out for Oregon Territory. By 1854, more than a dozen additional church of Christ families from Monmouth, many of them related to each other or to Davidson, had joined him. In February 1859, Davidson and other trustees efforts to prohibit the importation, exportation, sale, and consumption of alcohol in Monmouth became a reality. One of the main arguments Davidson and his fellow religious supporters used to push prohibition legislation was, "to enable them to suppress and prevent nuisances, to render the possession of life and property more secure, [and] to enable them to improve and embellish the streets of the town."

Despite the efforts of certain merchants to repeal prohibition in Monmouth throughout its history, their efforts proved fruitless. What was most important to the local religious community was to keep prohibition for the betterment of the social order of Monmouth. Although opponents raised religious, moral, economic, and quality-of-life arguments similar to those preached during the nineteenth century, they also brought two new arguments to center stage: the historic nature of Monmouth's prohibition and the uniqueness that local prohibition brought to the town.

Eventually support for the prohibition ordinance started to wear thin throughout the community of Monmouth. Although die-hard supporters of prohibition continued to fight the inevitable, there were signs that it was starting to become more and more detrimental to the social and economic aspects of the community. Some claim that prohibition had reduced property values, others that it restricted development of the business sector in town.  Opponents of repeal brought forth many arguments for staying dry, including initiating one rumor that the land donated so long ago for the site of the University would revert to the heirs of the donors if the ordinance was repealed, resulting in a huge cost to the state to repurchase it.

After failing by a nearly 5 to 1 margin in the early 1970s, repeal was passed by the voters in November 2002, and Monmouth ended its long tenure as the last dry town on the west coast.

Geography
It lies in the Ash Creek watershed, slightly west of the Willamette River.

Demographics

2010 census
As of the census of 2010, there were 9,534 people, 3,247 households, and 1,769 families living in the city. The racial makeup of the city was 82.8% White, 1.1% African American, 1.5% Native American, 3.3% Asian, 0.6% Pacific Islander, 6.6% from other races, and 4.1% from two or more races. Hispanic or Latino of any race were 13.4% of the population.

There were 3,247 households, of which 26.8% had children under the age of 18 living with them, 41.8% were married couples living together, 9.4% had a female householder with no husband present, 3.3% had a male householder with no wife present, and 45.5% were non-families. 23.9% of all households were made up of individuals, and 7.5% had someone living alone who was 65 years of age or older. The average household size was 2.52 and the average family size was 3.07.

The median age in the city was 23.7 years. 18.2% of residents were under the age of 18; 34.9% were between the ages of 18 and 24; 20.8% were from 25 to 44; 16.8% were from 45 to 64; and 9.4% were 65 years of age or older. The gender makeup of the city was 47.9% male and 52.1% female.

2000 census
As of the census of 2000, there were 7,741 people, 2,757 households, and 1,488 families living in the city. The population density was 4,004.3 people per square mile (1,548.6/km). There were 2,934 housing units at an average density of 1,517.7 per square mile (587.0/km). The racial makeup of the city was 85.67% White, 0.92% African American, 1.05% Native American, 2.04% Asian, 0.74% Pacific Islander, 6.21% from other races, and 3.37% from two or more races. Hispanic or Latino of any race were 9.73% of the population.

There were 2,757 households, out of which 26.6% had children under the age of 18 living with them, 41.7% were married couples living together, 9.4% had a female householder with no husband present, and 46.0% were non-families. 24.4% of all households were made up of individuals, and 7.5% had someone living alone who was 65 years of age or older. The average household size was 2.50 and the average family size was 3.03.

In the city, the population was spread out, with 19.5% under the age of 18, 35.9% from 18 to 24, 21.2% from 25 to 44, 14.5% from 45 to 64, and 8.9% who were 65 years of age or older. The median age was 23 years. For every 100 females, there were 86.9 males. For every 100 females age 18 and over, there were 81.3 males.

The median income for a household in the city was $32,256, and the median income for a family was $48,600. Males had a median income of $33,500 versus $25,185 for females. The per capita income for the city was $14,474. About 7.1% of families and 24.6% of the population were below the poverty line, including 14.1% of those under age 18 and 5.6% of those age 65 or over.

Education
Monmouth is served by the Central School District and is the home of Western Oregon University.

The only public high school serving the town is Central High School, located in the nearby town of Independence.

Talmadge Middle School is the only middle school feeding CHS, and is located just down the street, in Independence.

Elementary schools include Ash Creek Elementary School and Monmouth Elementary School, but there is also Independence Elementary School.

See also
Bethel, Polk County, Oregon
Monmouth Business Association
Shop Polk County

References

Further reading
 Scott McArthur, Monmouth, Oregon: the Saga of a Small American Town. Rickreall, Oregon: Polk County History Museum, 2004.
 Edna Mingus, Monmouth, 'The Growth of an Idea,' 1856-1956. Salem, OR: Johnson & Siewert, n.d. [1956].

External links

https://sos.oregon.gov/blue-book/Pages/local/cities/l-r/monmouth.aspx Entry for Monmouth] in the  Oregon Blue Book

Historic photos of Monmouth from Salem Public Library
Religious history of Monmouth from Northwest College of the Bible

 
Cities in Oregon
Populated places established in 1853
Salem, Oregon metropolitan area
Cities in Polk County, Oregon
1853 establishments in Oregon Territory